Lyle Rowe (born 13 June 1987) is a South African professional golfer.

Rowe plays on the Sunshine Tour and won his first tournament in June 2014 at the inaugural Zambia Sugar Open.

Professional wins (5)

Sunshine Tour wins (3)

Sunshine Tour playoff record (0–1)

Big Easy Tour wins (1)

Jamega Pro Golf Tour wins (1)

References

External links

South African male golfers
Sunshine Tour golfers
Sportspeople from Port Elizabeth
White South African people
1987 births
Living people